Abigail is a Japanese black metal band from Tokyo formed in 1992. Their first gig was in August 1992, where they served as the opening act for Sigh. At one point in time, Abigail was hailed as "The Most Evil Band in Japan." Their debut album, Intercourse & Lust, was released in 1996. The band has released six full-length studio albums, and numerous more extended plays, splits, and live albums. Bandleader Yasuyuki Suzuki has cited Bulldozer, NME, Venom, Bathory, Hellhammer, Celtic Frost, the early works of Mayhem, Darkthrone, VON, Misfits, and GG Allin as influences.

American musician Joel Grind, best known for his work with Toxic Holocaust, has performed with the band as a live member. Grind and Yasuyuki Suzuki also have a project together called Tiger Junkies.

Members

Current members 

 Yasuyuki Suzuki- Vocals, guitar, bass (1992–present)
 Youhei Ono- Drums (1992-1993, 1995–present)
 Noboru "Jero" Sakuma- Guitar
 Ayahanda Rani Kulup - seksofon

Past members 

 Yasunori Nagamine- Guitar (1992-1993, 1995-?)
 Asuka Matsuzaki- Guitar (2002-2003)

Current live musicians 

 Satoshi Ishida- Guitar (2017–present)

Past live musicians 

 Noboru "Jero" Sakuma- Guitar (now an official member)
 Shinichi Ishikawa- Guitar
 Joel Grind- Vocals, guitar
 TND- Bass (2002)

Discography 
This discography contains only their full-length studio albums:

 Intercourse & Lust (1996, Modern Invasion Music)
 Forever Street Metal Bitch (2003, Drakkar Productions)
 Fucking Louder Than Hell (2004, From Beyond Productions)
 Ultimate Unholy Death (2005, Nuclear War Now!)
 Sweet Baby Metal Slut (2010, Nuclear War Now!)
 The Final Damnation (2016, Nuclear War Now!)

References 

Musical groups established in 1992
Japanese black metal musical groups
Japanese thrash metal musical groups